Ocean Force is an American television series that began airing in 2007. The factual series follows lifeguards on busy beaches, and the work they do from water rescues to keeping order on the beach. The series airs in the United States on truTV.

International distribution

Broadcast and distribution

References

External links 
 Official website

TruTV original programming
2007 American television series debuts
2000s American reality television series
2010s American reality television series
Television series by Original Productions
Surf lifesaving